Gaganjit Singh Barnala is an Indian Politician from the state of Punjab.

Political career
Barnala represented the Dhuri Assembly Constituency and was a  member of the Punjab Legislative Assembly from 2002 to 2007.

Barnala is a member of Shiromani Akali Dal (Longowal) he was in past a member of the Shiromani Akali Dal .

Personal life
Barnala's father Surjit Singh Barnala was the  former Chief Minister of Punjab and former Governor of Tamil Nadu, Uttarakhand, Andhra Pradesh he was also a Union Minister in the Government of India.

Barnala was named as an accused in a rape case in 2006 but was acquitted of all charges in 2009.

References

People from Barnala
Living people
Indian Sikhs
Shiromani Akali Dal politicians
Punjabi people
Punjab, India MLAs 2002–2007
Year of birth missing (living people)